San Pedro de la Nave ("St. Peter of the Nave") is an Early Medieval church in the province of Zamora, Spain. It is in the locality of El Campillo in the municipal unit of San Pedro de la Nave-Almendra. It was moved from its original site near the River Esla when the land was to be flooded by the construction of the Ricobayo reservoir.

The church, one of the oldest churches in Spain, is of architectural interest and is being considered for World Heritage Site status along with nine other Mozarabic sites.
It is currently on a "tentative list" (part of the nominating process).

History
The traditional interpretation is that the church foundation goes back to the reign of Egica in the seventh century, having been built between 680 and before the Muslim conquest of Hispania in 711; San Pedro de la Nave would thus be one of the last works of Visigothic architecture. 

The church's first design corresponded to a Roman cross in plan, although later two lateral naves were added, which gave it a hybrid shape between basilical and cruciform. It also has five rooms, two on each side of the Presbytery, that must have served as hermits' cells. In sum a rectangular plan of approximately 5.6 by 2.1 meters is established, from which eight chapels project: the rectangular central apsidal chapel and two others at the ends of the transept. The central nave, as is usually the case, is taller and wider than the aisles and is separated from them by arches supported by strong pillars.

Description
The roof of the church is supported by a barrel vault, but while the vault of the nave and the aisles retains its original stone structure, the western sections of the building are vaulted in brick from the earlier springing points of the ashlar masonry. The arches used are of the horseshoe type (greater than half a circle) of Visigothic architecture. The two arches perpendicular to the axis of the nave spring from impost blocks supported on columns attached to the piers. The arch opening onto the apse is a tighter horseshoe shape resting on two columns in the jambs of the opening.

The decoration of the church is among the most outstanding of pre-Romanesque architecture.  There are two types of elements, deriving from different artistic conceptions and different craftsmen: first, a wide frieze corresponding to a course of the ashlar masonry, which shows a successions of circles with various vegetal and animal motives; second, the capitals of the engaged columns. These are of an excellent workmanship superior to that of the frieze. They show biblical scenes such as Daniel in the Lion's Den or The Sacrifice of Isaac. Their abacus blocks are decorated with volutes containing human and animal figures.

There is also a sun-dial inscribed on a stone in the interior wall of the church. The clock was never finished.

Conservation
It was declared a national monument on April 22, 1912.

Originally the church was sited on the banks of the river Esla, but, when the Ricobayo dam was built, creating a reservoir, the building was moved to avoid submersion in the higher waters of the Esla. Thanks to the efforts of Manuel Gómez-Moreno, it was decided that the church would be moved stone by stone to its current location.  This operation was carried out in 1930-32, under the direction of the architect Alejandro Ferrant Vázquez.

See also
 List of oldest church buildings

Notes

External links
 Official Blog of the Parish of San Pedro de la Nave
 El Portal del Arte Románico; Visigothic, Mozarabe and Romanesque Art in Spain.
 San Pedro de la Nave webpage   
 The Romanesque in Zamora 
 The Art of medieval Spain, A.D. 500-1200, an exhibition catalog from The Metropolitan Museum of Art Libraries (fully available online as PDF), which contains material on San Pedro de la Nave (p. 15-16)

Bien de Interés Cultural landmarks in the Province of Zamora
9th-century churches in Spain
10th-century churches in Spain
Pedro de la Nave
Pre-Romanesque architecture in Spain
Relocated buildings and structures